Julius Salter Elias, 1st Viscount Southwood (5 January 1873 – 10 April 1946), was a British newspaper proprietor and Labour politician. He rose from humble origins to become head of Odhams Press, Britain's largest newspaper and printing combine.

Elias was born in Birmingham, the youngest of the seven children of David Elias, a manufacturer and salesman of jet buttons and brooches whose initial success in the 1860s diminished as fashions changed. They moved to London where his father set up as a newsagent and confectioner at 81 The Grove, Hammersmith. Elias rose at 6 a.m. each morning to deliver newspapers in Hammersmith before going to school.

He left school at the age of 13 and tried various jobs before going to work as an office-boy at Odhams Bros, then a small printing firm in Hart Street employing about twenty people. When his son began work at Odhams, David Elias returned to the jet business, reviving his links with Whitby and importing large quantities of jet buttons for London dressmakers; although the family were not wealthy, they were able to live comfortably at Lonsdale Square at Barnsbury, Islington.

Julius worked his way up to become managing director and eventually chairman of the firm, which after a merger with John Bull in 1920 took the name Odhams Press Ltd. He was also managing director and chairman of the company that controlled the Illustrated London News.

Elias was raised to the peerage as Baron Southwood, of Fernhurst in the County of Sussex, in 1937. In 1944 he was appointed Chief Whip of the Labour Party in the House of Lords, which he remained until the following year. In January 1946 he was made Viscount Southwood, of Fernhurst in the County of Sussex.

In 1906, Lord Southwood married Alice Louise, daughter of Charles Stone Collard, head of a London firm of chartered accountants based at Queen Victoria Street, near the Lord Mayor of London's official residence, Mansion House. They had no children. He died from a heart attack at his Highgate home in April 1946, aged 73. The titles died with him.

References

External links

|-

1873 births
1946 deaths
Labour Party (UK) hereditary peers
Viscounts created by George VI
Barons created by George VI
Odhams Press